Sofiane Ben Letaief (born 19 October 1966) is a Tunisian table tennis player. He competed in the men's doubles event at the 1988 Summer Olympics.

References

1966 births
Living people
Tunisian male table tennis players
Olympic table tennis players of Tunisia
Table tennis players at the 1988 Summer Olympics
Place of birth missing (living people)
20th-century Tunisian people